Hilário Cuenú is a Colombian football manager and former defender. He is the manager of Cortuluá U20.

References

Living people
Colombian footballers
1975 births
Cortuluá footballers
Independiente Santa Fe footballers
Atlético Nacional footballers
América de Cali footballers
Deportes Tolima footballers
Atlético Junior footballers
Atlético Huila footballers
Categoría Primera A players
Atlético Bucaramanga footballers
Association football defenders
Sportspeople from Valle del Cauca Department